The United Nations Iraq–Kuwait Observation Mission (UNIKOM) was established on April 9, 1991 following the Gulf War by Security Council Resolution 689 (1991) and fully deployed by early May 1991.

The task of joint military observers was to monitor the demilitarized zone (DMZ) along the Iraq-Kuwait border and the Khawr 'Abd Allah waterway, deter border violations and report any hostile action. On February 5, 1993, under Security Council Resolution 806, the mandate was extended to include physical action to prevent violations and the force was expanded to an intended three mechanized infantry battalions plus support.

The mandate of UNIKOM was completed on October 6, 2003.

The force's headquarters were in Umm Qasr, Iraq, within the DMZ. The maximum strength of the force was 1,187 on February 28, 1995. The Security Council extended its mandate for a final time in July 2003. At the time of the withdrawal on September 30, 2003 there were four military observers and 131 civilian staff. During the mission there were 18 fatalities.

Contributors are Argentina, Austria, Bangladesh (including the mechanized infantry battalion), Canada, Chile, China, Denmark, Fiji, Finland, France, Germany, Ghana, Greece, Hungary, India, Indonesia, Ireland, Italy, Kenya, Malaysia, Nigeria, Norway, Pakistan, Philippines, Poland, Romania, Russian Federation (Soviet Union before December 24, 1991), Senegal, Singapore, Sweden, Switzerland, Tanzania, Thailand, Turkey, United Kingdom, United States, Uruguay and Venezuela
In addition, during the setting-up phase (April–October 1991), UNIKOM included a Canadian combat engineer regiment (1 CER), a Security Battalion consisting of a multinational Bn Staff (SWE-FIN-NOR) and five infantry companies, drawn from UNFICYP and UNIFIL. Those troops were provided by Austria, Denmark, Fiji, Ghana, Nepal, and United States. There was also a maintenance/repair & recovery unit from Norway and a HQ logistic company from Sweden drawn from UNIFIL.

See also
 Iraq–Kuwait border

References
Bury, Jan (2003). "The UN Iraq-Kuwait Observation Mission". International Peacekeeping, 10 (2): 71–88.

External links

 Records of the United Nations Iraq-Kuwait Observation Mission (UNIKOM) (1991-2003) at the United Nations Archives

Foreign relations of Kuwait
Kuwait
United Nations operations in Iraq
687
Iraq–Kuwait relations
Military operations involving India
Kuwait and the United Nations